The Cheshire Mammoth Cheese was a gift from the town of Cheshire, Massachusetts to President Thomas Jefferson in 1802.  The  cheese was created by combining the milk from every cow in the town, and made in a makeshift cheese press to handle the cheese's size. The cheese bore the Jeffersonian motto "Rebellion to tyrants is obedience to God."

History
The town of Cheshire was incorporated in 1793 from parts of Adams, New Ashford, Lanesborough, and Windsor.  The original settlers came from Rhode Island and created New Providence Plantation on Providence Hill, later renamed to Stafford Hill in honor of Col. Joab Stafford who originally surveyed the area in 1767 and later led local revolutionary soldiers against the British in the Battle of Bennington.

Given the political landscape of the time, there was a fear that the more Republican Jefferson, considered an "infidel of the French Revolutionary school," would harm the religious interests of the citizenry, and that "the altars of New England would be demolished, and all their religious institutions would be swept away by an inrushing and irresistible flood of French infidelity."

One pastor in Cheshire, Elder John Leland, opposed this line of thought.  A beleaguered minority in Calvinist New England, the Baptists were perhaps the strongest advocates in the early republic of the separation of church and state.  Leland had met Jefferson during his time in Virginia and the two grew to have a friendly relationship.  Leland remembered this as he served in Cheshire, and campaigned strongly for Jefferson.

Making the cheese
Leland, believing that his efforts helped Jefferson win the Presidency, encouraged his townspeople to make a unique gesture to Jefferson.  He urged each member of his congregation "who owned a cow to bring every quart of milk given on a given day, or all the curd it would make, to a great cider mill..."  Leland also insisted that "no Federal cow" (a cow owned by a Federalist farmer) be allowed to offer any milk, "lest it should leaven the whole lump with a distasteful savour."  The Cheese itself was produced solely by the persons and labor of freeborn farmers of Cheshire, Berkshire County. As stated in a letter for Reverend John Leland to President Thomas Jefferson, the Cheese was made "without the assistance of a single slave."

The townspeople brought their milk (according to Dumas Malone's biography on Jefferson, the cheese was made from the milk of 900 cows) and curd to the mill where a large hoop was placed on a cider press, resulting in a massive cheese press.  The townspeople added their ingredients, sang a hymn over the press, and, after a time, the cheese was ready.  As more ingredients than were necessary were presented, three smaller cheeses were created, but Leland dedicated the largest cheese to Jefferson, calling the cheese "the greatest cheese ever put to press in the New World or Old."

Due to its size, it could not safely be transported on wheels, so the town hired a sleigh to bring it to a barge on the Hudson River for the start of its trip to Washington, D.C.  After floating down the Hudson River (North River) to New York City, the mammoth cheese was loaded onto the sloop Astrea and taken to Baltimore, Maryland, where it was loaded onto a horse-drawn wagon for the trip to Washington. The three-week,  journey from Cheshire to Washington became an event from town to town as word spread about the gift.

Delivery to the White House
The cheese was eventually presented to Jefferson on January 1, 1802.  Leland considered the cheese an act of "profound respect...to the popular ratification of his election."  While the cheese did serve to praise Jefferson, the town also made a political statement in its letter to Jefferson, noting that "the cheese was procured by the personal labor of freeborn farmers with the voluntary and cheerful aid of their wives and daughters, without the assistance of a single slave." Although the gift would draw criticisms of Jefferson and the people of Cheshire, Jefferson praised the act as "extraordinary proof of the skill with which those domestic arts...are practiced by [the citizens of Cheshire]."  The President then cut a piece of the cheese to present to the town, and it was widely considered the greatest cheese presented at the White House.  Jefferson, who opposed the gift giving custom on principle, gave a $200 donation (over 50% of the actual market price) to Leland's congregation as a gesture of gratitude.

The cheese remained at the White House for over two years, having been featured in a public dinner for an Independence Day celebration in 1803, eventually being replaced by the "Mammoth Loaf," a large loaf of bread made by the United States Navy out of a barrel full of flour.

Future inspiration
The story of the mammoth cheese has inspired many future events. President Andrew Jackson's supporters commissioned a similar cheese for consumption in 1837, as his supporters believed that "every honor which Jefferson had ever received should be paid him."  This event later became the inspiration for a recurring event on the White House television drama The West Wing, entitled "Big Block of Cheese Day." The cheese inspired a critically acclaimed work of fiction, The Mammoth Cheese, by Sheri Holman in 2004 and published by the Grove Press, which told the story about a small town cheesemaker convinced by her pastor to make a giant cheese for the President-elect. The cheese also became the subject of a children's picture book published by Farrar, Straus and Giroux, A Big Cheese for the White House, by Candace Fleming, and was a subject of the American History comedy podcast The Dollop.
Today a cast concrete cheese press stands in Cheshire. A plaque dedicated to Leland is affixed to it.

References

External links
The History Tavern (on the Cheshire Cheese, Freeborn Farmers and Elder John Leland, July 5, 1802)

Thomas Jefferson
Cheshire, Massachusetts
Cow's-milk cheeses
1802 works